West Rusk County Consolidated Independent School District is a public school district based in New London, Texas, United States.  In addition to New London, small portions of the town of Overton and Henderson are within the district.

There are four campuses in West Rusk Consolidated ISD - West Rusk High (Grades 9-12), West Rusk Middle (Grades 6-8), West Rusk Intermediate (3-5) and West Rusk Elementary (Grades PK-2).

See also
New London School explosion

References

External links

School districts in Rusk County, Texas
School districts established in 1877
1877 establishments in Texas